Clearwater Lake or Lake Clearwater  may refer to:

Lakes

Canada
Clearwater Lake (British Columbia)
Clearwater Lake (Manitoba)
Clearwater Lake (Ontario)
Clearwater Lake (Saskatchewan)
Clearwater Lakes, the English name of the Lac à l'Eau Claire, a pair of impact craters in northern Québec

United States
Clearwater Lake Recreation Area, a lake and surrounding area in Ocala National Forest, Florida
Clearwater Lake (Cook County, Minnesota)
Clearwater Lake (Missouri), on the border of Reynolds and Wayne Counties, formed by the Clearwater Dam
Clearwater Lake (Wisconsin), in Oneida County

Other countries
Lake Clearwater, in Canterbury Region, New Zealand
Clear Lake (Palau) or Clearwater Lake

Settlements
Lake Clearwater (village), in Canterbury Region, New Zealand
Clearwater Lake, Wisconsin, US

See also
 Clearwater (disambiguation)